Blepephaeus hiekei is a species of beetle in the family Cerambycidae. It was described by Stephan von Breuning in 1974. It is known from India.

References

Blepephaeus
Beetles described in 1974